William Rees may refer to:

Sports
William Rees (rugby) (1899–1968), rugby union and rugby league footballer of the 1920s and 1930s
William Lee Rees (1836–1912), English-born New Zealand cricketer, politician and lawyer
Billy Rees (1924–1996), association footballer of the 1940s and 1950s

Religious figures
William Rees (priest and writer) (1859–1936), earlier Welsh Anglican priest
William Jenkins Rees (1772–1855), Welsh cleric and antiquary
William Rees (Archdeacon of St Asaph) (1905–?), later Welsh Anglican priest

Others
William Rees (Liberal politician), in 1390 MP for Norfolk
William Hurst Rees (1917–2004), British surveyor and member of the Lands Tribunal
William James Rees (1913–1967), British hydroid and cephalopod researcher
William E. Rees (born 1943), originator of "ecological footprint" concept
William Rees (cinematographer) (1904–1961), American cinematographer
William Rees (Gwilym Hiraethog) (1802–1883), writer
William Rees (veterinary surgeon) (1928–2018), Chief Veterinary Officer of the United Kingdom, 1980–1988
William Gilbert Rees (1827–1898), explorer, surveyor, and early settler in Central Otago, New Zealand

See also
William Rees-Mogg (1928–2012), British journalist, writer and politician
William Reese (disambiguation)
William Rees-Davies (disambiguation)